Steinheim may refer to:


Places 
 Steinheim, Westphalia, in the district of Höxter, North Rhine-Westphalia, Germany
 Steinheim an der Murr, in the district of Ludwigsburg, Baden-Württemberg, Germany
 Steinheim am Albuch, in the district of Heidenheim, Baden-Württemberg, Germany
 Steinheim (Hanau), the former Steinheim am Main, a district of Hanau, Hessen, Germany
 Steinheim, Luxembourg, a small town in the commune of Rosport, Luxembourg

Craters  
 Steinheim crater, meteorite crater in Germany
 Steinheim (Martian crater), crater on Mars

Surname 
 Solomon Ludwig Steinheim (1789–1866), German Jewish philosopher

See also 
 6563 Steinheim, main-belt asteroid
 Steinheim skull